Leo John Keena (April 12, 1878 – December 13, 1967) was an American football player and diplomat.

Early years
Keena was born in Detroit, Michigan in 1878, the son of James T. Keena and Henrietta (Boyle) Keena.  His father was a lawyer who later became the president of the Peoples State Bank of Detroit.

University of Michigan
Keena played college football as a fullback and kicker for the University of Michigan from 1897 to 1899.  He served in the United States Navy as a seaman on the auxiliary cruiser  during the Spanish–American War.

Diplomatic career
After receiving his degree, Keena became a diplomat for the United States in 1909.  He was married in August 1906 to Eleanor Clarke.  Keena's early diplomatic posts include service as U.S. Consul in Chihuahua, Mexico (1909–10), U.S. Counsel to Florence, Italy (1910–14), U.S. Consul General in Buenos Aires, Argentina (1914–15), U.S. Consul General in Valparaíso, Chile (1915–19), U.S. Consul General in Zürich, Switzerland (1919–20), U.S. Consul General in Warsaw, Poland (1920–22), U.S. Consul in Liverpool, England (1924–26), U.S. Counsul General in Havana, Cuba (1927–29), and U.S. Counsul General in Paris (1929–32).  He was appointed by U.S. President Franklin D. Roosevelt and served as the United States Ambassador to Honduras from February 1935 to May 1937 and as United States Ambassador to South Africa from July 1937 to August 1942.

Later life and death
After his assignment to South Africa, Keena retired from the Foreign Service in 1943. He died in Knysna in December 1967.

Notes

References

1878 births
1967 deaths
19th-century players of American football
American football fullbacks
Detroit Titans football players
Michigan Wolverines football players
Ambassadors of the United States to Honduras
Ambassadors of the United States to South Africa
American military personnel of the Spanish–American War
Players of American football from Detroit